Schick is an American brand of personal care and safety razors which was founded in 1926 by Jacob Schick. It is currently owned by Edgewell Personal Care.

Schick is second in sales to Gillette globally, however Schick is the top-selling brand of safety razors and blades in Japan. The Schick brand products are sold in North America, Australia, Asia and Russia. In Europe Edgewell sells the same items but they have the Wilkinson Sword brand.

Schick also markets shaving gels.

History
Schick was founded in 1926 by Jacob Schick, "the father of electric razors," as the Magazine Repeating Razor Company. In the same year Schick introduced its highly successful single blade safety razor system which stores twenty blades in a steel injector. Schick sold the company in 1928 to start another unrelated company with his name to market his newly invented electric shavers.

Patrick Frawley purchased controlling shares in Schick in 1955 and held onto the company until 1970, when the company became a division of Warner–Lambert. In February 2000, Pfizer bought Warner—Lambert along with all of its subsidiary companies. 

Schick was purchased by Energizer in 2003 from Pfizer. On July 1, 2015, Energizer split into two companies and Schick is now a subsidiary of Edgewell Personal Care.

Products 

 Schick Hydro: Schick's redesigned razor system released on April 6, 2010.
 Schick Hydro 5: A five-blade razor system with "skin guards advanced hydrating gel and a flip trimmer" (hydrates only while shaving). 
 Schick Hydro 3: A three-blade razor system similar to the 5-blade system but without a flip trimmer.
 Schick Hydro Silk: A five-blade women's razor system. Initially introduced only as a Schick model, but added to the Wilkinson Sword line in late 2012.
 Schick Hydro 5 Power Select: A motorized version of the Hydro 5, with three user-selectable vibration levels.
 Schick Intuition: A women's shaving system that lathers and shaves at the same time.
 Schick Quattro: a four-bladed razor for men, introduced in 2003. The Quattro Midnight and Quattro Chrome are models with redesigned handles and different color schemes from the original Quattro.
 Quattro Power: A motorized version of the Quattro; it is supposed to reduce friction. The Quattro Titanium Power is a Quattro Power with a different color scheme and Quattro Titanium cartridges. The Quattro Power is powered by a single AAA battery.
 Quattro Titanium: includes a titanium coating on the blades that is claimed to reduce irritation. There is also a Quattro Titanium Trimmer that includes a short face trimmer powered by a AAA battery.
 Quattro for Women: A modified version of the Quattro with a feminine color scheme.
 Schick Protector: A razor that is claimed to protect against nicks.
 Schick Tracer: A two-bladed razor with flexible blades that is supposed to conform with the surface of the face.
 Tracer FX: A modified Tracer for sensitive skin
 FX Diamond: A Tracer with blades that are supposed to stay sharp longer.
 Schick Xtreme3: A three-blade men's shaving razor.
 Schick XTreme3 Disposable: A disposable version of the Xtreme3,  introduced in 1999.
 Schick XTreme3 SubZero: An improved version of the Xtreme3 razor.
 Schick Slim Twin: A two-bladed disposable razor that comes in four different varieties.
 Schick Double Edge Razor, also known as Schick Krona: A Twist-To-Open safety razor produced from 1965 until the late 1970s.
 Schick Injector Razor: A single edge injector style family of razors introduced in 1935 and produced until the early 2000s. (The blades are still manufactured)

References

External links 

 

Razor brands
Personal care brands
American brands
American companies established in 1926
Products introduced in 1926
Edgewell Personal Care
Male grooming brands